Events in the year 2019 in Suriname.

Incumbents 
 President: Dési Bouterse
 Vice President: Ashwin Adhin
 Speaker: Jennifer Simons

Events

Deaths

6 January – Bea Vianen, writer (b. 1935).

7 August – Orlando Grootfaam, footballer (b. 1974).

11 November – Winston Lackin, politician (b. 1954).

References

 
2010s in Suriname
Years of the 21st century in Suriname
Suriname
Suriname